Stonehurst, New Jersey may refer to:

Stonehurst East, New Jersey
Stonehurst West, New Jersey